Martha Schneider-Bürger (21 October 1903 in Sterkrade (Oberhausen) – 25 September 2001 in Gelnhausen) was a German civil engineer.

Early life and education 
Martha Schneider-Bürger was the eldest of four daughters born to engineer Hugo Bürger.After graduating from high school in 1923, Martha Schneider-Bürger began studying structural engineering at the Technische Hochschule Karlsruhe (now Karlsruhe Institute of Technology) and after her intermediate diploma in 1925 she transferred to the Technische Hochschule Munich, a predecessor of Technical University of Munich, where she was the first German female civil engineer to graduate in 1927.

Career 
Martha Schneider-Bürger began her professional career in a Düsseldorf engineering office before joining the Wirtschaftsvereinigung Stahl - Beratungsstelle für Stahlverwendung (an association giving advice on the deployment of steel) in 1929 for ten years. She married Max Schneider and after the birth of two children she continued to work for this association as a freelancer.

In 1930, Martha Schneider-Bürger joined the Association of German Engineers. She was a member of various committees, including the group Women in the Engineering Profession. Furthermore, she supported the German Institute for Standardisation and contributed to the standardisation of steel construction issues.

Martha Schneider-Bürger is known primarily through her tables of steel sections which were used for decades and were published in 23 editions.

Commemoration 
In 2011 a square in Oberhausen-Sterkrade was named after her.

Publication 
 Martha Schneider-Bürger: Stahlbau-Profile. 23. edition, Verlag Stahleisen, Düsseldorf 2001,

Further reading 
 Maritta Petersen: Martha Schneider-Bürger, in: Klaus Stiglat (Ed.) Bauingenieure und ihr Werk, Berlin 2004, p. 379–380,

References 

1903 births
2001 deaths
German civil engineers
Technical University of Munich alumni
Karlsruhe Institute of Technology alumni
People from Oberhausen
German women
German women engineers